is a private university in Shinjuku, Tokyo, Japan. Its predecessor was named "Koshu Gakko" (工手学校) and was one of the oldest private engineering schools in Japan.

History

Koshu Gakko (工手学校, lit. technicians school) was founded in 1887 by educator, politician, and president of Tokyo Imperial University, Koki Watanabe, president of Imperial College of Engineering, Furuichi Kōi and professors of Tokyo Imperial University including Tatsuno Kingo.

The Koshu Gakko was an evening school. It had civil, mechanical, electric, architecture, ship building, mining, metallurgical, and chemical engineering courses when it was established. In 1928, the school was renamed "Kogakuin" which means "Institute of Engineering" or "Institute of Technology" in Japanese.

In 1949, the school was chartered as a four-year university. In 1964, it had master's courses; in 1966 it had doctorate courses in the graduate school.

References

External links

 Official website
 Official website 

Educational institutions established in 1887
Private universities and colleges in Japan
Universities and colleges in Tokyo
Engineering universities and colleges in Japan
1887 establishments in Japan